George Boardman may refer to:

 George Boardman (missionary) (1801–1831), American missionary
 George Boardman the Younger (1828–1903), his son, American Baptist theologian and writer
 George Boardman (footballer, born 1904), Scottish professional footballer
 George Boardman (footballer, born 1943), Scottish professional footballer
 George Augustus Boardman (1818–1901), American ornithologist